Hynčice is a municipality and village in Náchod District in the Hradec Králové Region of the Czech Republic. It has about 200 inhabitants.

Twin towns – sister cities

Hynčice is twinned with:
 Radków, Poland

References

Villages in Náchod District